Pariani is a surname. Notable people with the surname include:

Alberto Pariani (1876–1955), Italian general
Brian Pariani (born 1965), American football coach
Gino Pariani (1928–2007), American soccer player

See also
Parian (disambiguation)